Good Muslim, Bad Muslim (stylized #GoodMuslimBadMuslim) is a comedy podcast hosted by two Muslim women about being a Muslim woman in America.

Background 
Zahra Noorbakhsh and Tanzila Ahmed met on a book tour for Love, InshAllah. They started a running joke on Twitter that eventually led to the creation of the podcast. The hosts are creating the podcast in hopes that it creates a positive change in Muslim communities, and address Islamophobia in America. Topics explored by the podcast are broad in subject matter. The hosts discuss how they are viewed as "bad" by Muslim communities for not being religious enough, but they are viewed as "good" by non-Muslims for being less religious.

Zahra Noorbakhsh comes from a Persian-American family that moved to the states in the 1980s.

References

External links 

2015 podcast debuts
Audio podcasts
American podcasts
Religion and spirituality podcasts
Comedy and humor podcasts
Islamic podcasts